Donald Clinton Rogers (born December 4, 1936) is a former professional American football player who played offensive lineman for five seasons for the San Diego Chargers.

References

1936 births
American football offensive guards
American football centers
San Diego Chargers players
Los Angeles Chargers players
South Carolina Gamecocks football players
Living people
American Football League players